A paper-towel dispenser is a device that dispenses paper towels in a public toilet so that hands can be dried after hand washing. Some are operated by a handle, some by pulling the paper from the dispenser, and others by automatic dispensation in response to a motion sensor.

Such dispensers are common in North America and other western countries. They are either used to replace hand dryers or used in tandem to offer users alternatives to drying their hands. Some areas opt not to use them as towels create litter and are less environmentally friendly.  Replacing hand dryers with towels is seen as a way to reduce the further dispersal of toilet aerosols in public washrooms known as toilet plume.

Paper
The paper in the dispenser is usually white or brown. Some are similar to paper towels and have perforations to allow them to be ripped off, while others consist of stacked sheets. The third kind of paper towel is torn by an integrated blade.

See also
Soap dispenser

References

Dispensers
Public toilets